Sgt. Fury & his Howling Commandos: Shotgun Opera also known as simply Shotgun Opera or Sgt. Fury and his Howling Commandos, Vol. 2 is a 2009 comic book one-shot published by Marvel Comics. The story was written by Jesse Alexander and drawn by John Paul Leon.

Background
The one-shot was Alexander's first time writing a comic book and he stated in a pre-release interview that he had always loved war comics and was very happy to do it. The series was intended as a tie-in to Captain America: White, the delay of which resulted in this comic to be delayed.

Publication history 
The story was first published in 2009 as a one-shot. It was reprinted in the hardcover collected edition named Marvel, los héroes mas poderosos #21: "Nick Fury", in December 2016 which also collected the original series of Secret Warriors issue 1 to 6.

Plot
The story has Nick Fury and the Howling Commandos on a mission behind enemy lines in Yugoslavia. It’s in the early days of the war, when Germany had just invaded the country. Alexander chose to use the characters of Nick Fury, Dum-Dum, Reb, Izzy, Gabe and Pinky.

Reception
The comic holds an average rating of 6.4 by 2 professional critics on the review aggregation website Comic Book Roundup.

Jesse Schedeen of IGN expressed that he thought the story was a rather generic Howling Commandos story. He also criticised Alexander's character dialogue.

References

External links
 

Nick Fury titles
Howling Commandos
2009 comics debuts
Marvel Comics one-shots
Marvel Comics set during World War II